WABA (850 AM) is a radio station in Aguadilla, Puerto Rico, that broadcasts on 850 kHz.  The station has been on the air since 1951. WABA is the radio home to the Aguadilla Divas from the Female Superior Volleyball League, The Santeros de Aguada of the Superior Basketball League & the Aguadilla Sharks of the Superior Baseball League. The station covers the 75% of the entire western area. WABA is currently owned by Aguadilla Radio & TV Corporation, a local organization based in the western region and airs Spanish News/Talk linked to the Radio Isla Network.

External links 
waba850am.com

ABA
Radio stations established in 1951
1951 establishments in Puerto Rico
ABA (AM)